For Future Reference is the only studio album released by the British synth-pop band Dramatis. The album itself failed to reach the UK Albums Chart, however, one of the three singles released from the album, "Love Needs No Disguise" with Gary Numan providing vocals reached number 33 on the UK Singles Chart. The other singles from the album were "Ex Luna Scientia" and "Oh! Twenty Twenty Five"—titled "Oh! 2025" on the album. The album was reissued on CD in 2000 and retitled The Dramatis Project. The reissue was also credited to Tubeway Army featuring Gary Numan, despite Numan's only contribution being the vocal to "Love Needs No Disguise".

The album was made available again in 2014 as a digital download only, this time under the title Terrestrial Channels and with Numan as the sole artist credit.

Track listing
All tracks written by Dramatis.

"Oh! 2025"
"Human Sacrifice"
"I Only Find Rewind"
"No-One Lives Forever"
"Love Needs No Disguise"
"Turn"
"Take Me Home"
"On Reflection"
"Ex Luna Scientia"

Personnel
Chris Payne – keyboards, viola, cornamuse, recorders, backing vocals
Russell Bell – guitar, Chapman Stick, synthesizer, Vi-tar, saxophone, backing vocals
Cedric Sharpley – drums, percussion, electronic drums, backing vocals
Denis Haines – keyboards, vocal noises, backing vocals
Gary Numan – vocals ("Love Needs No Disguise")
Dramatis – producer, arrangements
Simon Heyworth – producer, engineer
Simon Smart – engineer

References

1981 debut albums
The Rocket Record Company albums
New wave albums by English artists
Synth-pop albums by English artists